The Island of Dr. Brain is the second game in the Dr. Brain series by Sierra On-Line. It was released in 1992 and was only available for IBM PC compatibles. Like the first game in the Dr. Brain series, Castle of Dr. Brain, Island is an educational puzzle adventure game.

The game was designed by Patrick Bridgemon, and was produced and directed by Brett Miller. Todd Powers was the lead programmer. The game's music was written by Rob Atesalp.

Gameplay
The game's story starts with an explanation by Dr. Brain. He tells the player that plans for his latest project were stolen, and he charges the player to retrieve a battery from his island and bring it to him. The player must then traverse the security puzzles Dr. Brain has set up throughout his island.

Reception
Computer Gaming Worlds Charles Ardai wrote that, given Castle of Dr. Brains quality, "one wonders how Sierra could have gotten everything so wrong the second time around", comparing The Island of Dr. Brain to a computer tutorial for the SAT test. He stated that "the puzzles are more contrived and less fun" and that while the game emphasized education more than its predecessor did—assuming knowledge of subjects like the periodic table, music, and literature—and its marketing claimed "We guarantee this game will entertain your child while he or she learns", The Island of Dr. Brain contained "several embarrassing, sloppy mistakes" like misspelling Jules Verne's name.

References

External links

1992 video games
DOS games
DOS-only games
Cancelled Amiga games
Cancelled classic Mac OS games
Children's educational video games
Point-and-click adventure games
Puzzle video games
ScummVM-supported games
Sierra Entertainment games
Sierra Discovery games
Video game sequels
Video games set on islands
Video games developed in the United States